Lakeview is an unincorporated community in Beaverhead County, Montana, United States. Lakeview lies along Southside Centennial Road, approximately halfway between Lima to the west and West Yellowstone to the east.

Originally named Shambow, for George H. Shambow, one of the area’s earliest residents and its first postmaster, this Centennial Valley town was renamed Magdalen and finally, in the late 1890s, Lakeview.

Red Rock Lakes National Wildlife Refuge is nearby.

Demographics

Notes

Unincorporated communities in Beaverhead County, Montana
Unincorporated communities in Montana